Conductive metal−organic frameworks are a class of metal–organic frameworks with intrinsic ability of electronic conduction. Metal ions and organic linker self-assemble to form a framework which can be 1D/2D/3D in connectivity. The first conductive MOF, Cu[Cu(2,3-pyrazinedithiol)2] was described in 2009 and exhibited electrical conductivity of 6 × 10−4 S cm−1 at 300 K.

Design and structure
The organic linkers for conductive MOFs are generally conjugated. 2D conductive MOFs have been explored well and several studies of 3D conductive MOFs have also been reported so far. Single crystal structure of a 2D conductive MOF Co(HHTP) [hexahydroxytriphenylene] was reported in 2012.

The conductivity of these materials are often tested by two probe method, i.e. a known potential is applied between two probes, the resulting current is measured, and resistance is calculated by using Ohm’s law. A four-probe method employs two wires on the extreme are used to supply a current and the inner two wires measure the drop in potential. This method eliminates the effect of contact resistance.

Most MOFs have conductivity less than 10−10 S cm−1 and are considered as Insulator. Based on the literature reports so far, conductivity range in the MOFs can vary from 10−10 to 103 S cm−1. Charge transfer in conductive MOFs have been attributed to three pathways: 1) Through-bond:- when d orbital of  transition metal ion overlaps with the p orbital of the organic linker, π electrons are delocalized across all the adjacent p orbitals. 2) Extended conjugation:- When transition metal ions are coupled with the a conjugated organic linker, the d-π conjugation allows delocalization of the charge carriers. 3) Through-space:- Organic linkers in one layer can interact with the one in the adjacent layer via π-π interaction. This will facilitate charge delocalization in the adjacent layers.

Synthesis

Solvothermal synthesis 

In 2017 Kimizuka reported a phthalocyanine based conductive MOF Cu-CuPc with an intrinsic conductivity in the range of 10−6 S cm−1. For the solvothermal synthesis of MOF, the organic linker Cu-octahydroxy phthalocyanine (CuPc) and metal ion is dissolved in a DMF/H2O mixture at heated at 130 °C for 48 hours. Afterwards, Mirica and co-workers were able to enhance the conductivity to a range of 10−2 S cm−1 by synthesizing a bimetallic phthalocyanine based MOF NiPc-Cu.

Hydrothermal synthesis 
Examples include a series of isoretical catecholate-based MOFs employing hexahudroxytriphenylene (HHTP) as thee organic linker and Ni/Cu/Co as metal nodes. For the hydrothermal synthesis of these MOFs, both organic linker (hexahydroxytriphenylene) and metal ion is dissolved in H2O, aqueous ammonia is added and mixture is heated. Cu3(HHTP) also known as (Cu-CAT-1) showed a conductivity up to 2.1 × 10−1 S cm−1. Another MOF based on hexaaminotriphenylene (HATP) organic linker and Ni metal ion showed an electronic conductivity of 40 S cm−1 when measured by using Van der Pauw method .

Layering method 
A Ni-BHT MOF nanosheet has been obtained using liquid-liquid interfacial synthesis. For the synthesis, organic linker is dissolved in dichloromethane upon which H2O is added and then metal salt (Ni(OAc)2) along with sodium bromide is added to the aqueous layer.

Potential applications
Although no conductive MOF has been commercialized, potential applications have been identified.

Electrochemical sensors 
Conductive MOF are of interest as a chemiresistive sensors. A 2D conductive MOF Cu3(HITP)2 and bulk  conductivity of this MOF was measured to be 0.2 S cm−1. It was employed for chemiresistive sensing of ammonia vapor and limit of detection of this material was 0.5 ppm. Two isoreticular MOFs based on phthalocyanine and naphthalocyanine organic linkers have been tested for sensing of neurotransmitters. In this study authors were able to get a very low limit of detection, NH3 (0.31-0.33 ppm), H2S (19-32 ppb) and NO (1-1.1 ppb) at a driving voltage of (0.01- 1.0 V). Later, same group also reported voltametric detection of neurochemical by isoreticular MOFs based on triphenylene organic linker. Ni3(HHTP)2 (2,3,6,7,10,11-hexahydroxytriphenylene) MOF showed nanomolar limit of detection of Dopamine (63±11 nM) and serotonin (40±17 nM). A 2D conductive MOF based on 2,3,7,8,12,13‐hexahydroxyl truxene linker and copper metal has shown promising electrochemical detection of paraquat.

Electrocatalysis 
MOFs have been explored for electrolysis to enhance the rate and selectivity of reactions. Owing to their high surface area they can provide large number of interaction site for the reaction, conductivity of the material allows charge transfer during the electrocatalytic process. Two Cobalt based MOFs Co-BHT (Benzenehexathiol) and Co-HTTP (Hexathioltriphenylene) have been investigated for hydrogen evolution reaction (HER). In this report, overpotential values for Co-BHT and Co-HTTP are found to be 340 mV and 530 mV respectively at pH 1.3. The tafel slopes are between 149 and 189 mV dec−1 at pH 4.2. Ultrathin sheets of Co-HAB MOF have been found to be catalytically active for oxygen evolution reaction (OER). Overpotential for this MOF was 310 mV at 10 mA cm−2 in 1M KOH. Authors claimed that the ultrathin sheets were better than nanoparticles/thick sheets/bulk Co-HAB MOF because of favourable electrode kinetics. A 2-D conductive MOF has also been employed as an electrocatalyst for oxygen reduction reaction (ORR). Ni3(HITP)2 MOF film on glassy carbon electrode in their study showed a potential of 820 mV at 50 μA in 0.1 M potassium hydroxide (KOH).

Energy storage 
MOFs with high surface area, redox active organic linker/metal nodes, intrinsic conductivity have attracted attention as electrode materials for electrochemical energy storage. First Conductive MOF-based electrochemical double layer capacitor (EDLC) was reported by Dinca and co-workers in 2017. They used Ni3(HITP)2 MOF for the fabrication of the device without using conductive additives which are mixed to enhance the conductivity. The resulting electrodes showed a gravimetric capacitance of 111 F g−1 and areal capacitance of 18 μF cm−2 at a discharge rate of 0.05 A g−1. These electrodes also exhibited a capacity retention of 90% after 10000 cycles. A conductive MOFs based on hexaaminobenzene (HAB) organic linker and Cu/Ni metal ions has been tested as electrode for supercapacitor. Ni-HAB and Cu-HAB exhibited gravimetric capacitance of 420 F g−1 and 215 F g−1 respectively. The pellet form of Ni-HAB electrode showed a gravimetric capacitance of 427 F g−1 and volumetric capacitance of 760 F g−1. These MOFs also exhibited a capacitance retention of 90% after 12000 cycles. First conductive MOF based cathode material for Lithium-ion battery was reported by Nishihara and co-workers in 2018. In this study they employed Ni3(HITP)2 MOF, It exhibited a specific capacity of 155 mA h g−1, specific energy density of 434 Wh kg−1 at A current density of 10 mA g−1, and good stability over 300 cycles. In another study, two MOFs based on 2,5‐dichloro‐3,6‐dihydroxybenzoquinone (Cl2dhbqn−) organic linker and Fe metal ions have been employed for Lithium ion battery. (H2NMe2)2Fe2(Cl2dhbq)3 (1) and (H2NMe2)4Fe3(Cl2dhbq)3(SO4)2 (2) showed electrical conductivity of 2.6×10−3 and 8.4×10−5 S cm−1 respectively. (2) exhibited discharge capacity of 165 mA h g−1 at a charging rate of 10 mA g−1) and (1) exhibited 195 mA h g−1 at 20 mA g−1 and a specific energy density of 533 Wh kg−1.

See also 
Metal−organic framework

Covalent−organic framework

Coordination polymer

Sensor

References

Chemistry
Inorganic chemistry